Heavy mortars are large-calibre mortars designed to fire a relatively heavy shell on a high angle trajectory.  Such weapons have a relatively short range, but are usually less complex than similar calibre field artillery.

This category includes the "Trench Mortars" of World War I which were all too heavy and cumbersome, and hence lacked the mobility, to be classed as infantry mortars.

Muzzle-loading

Breech-loading

Notes and references

See also 
List of the largest cannon by caliber
List of infantry mortars
List of siege artillery — which includes "super heavy" or siege mortars

Thor was a 600mm-caliber heavy mortar used by the German Army during World War II. This self-propelled artillery piece was one of a series of seven 60 cm mortars known as Karl Gerät (040). Designed and developed by Rheinmetall between 1937 and 1940, six of these seven powerful mortars were used during Operation Barbarossa, on the Eastern Front, taking part in the siege of Brest Fortress, the siege of Sevastopol, and the siege of Warsaw during the Polish uprising. They were called "Thor", "Loki", "Odin", "Ziu", "Adam", and "Eva".

Thor had a 5.07m-long barrel, a hydro-pneumatic recoil, and a horizontal sliding-wedge breech. It moved on tracks and was powered by a Daimler-Benz MB 507 C diesel engine, delivering 580 horsepower; for long distances it was transported by railways. Thor fired 2,170-kg concrete piercing shells to a range of 6.5 km (7 miles) with an elevation of 60°. These shells could penetrate 2.5m-thick reinforced concrete and 350mm-thick steel armor.

Specifications

Type: heavy siege mortar
Country of origin: Germany
Manufacturer: Rheinmetall
Weight: 124 metric tons
Caliber: 600mm (60 cm)
Barrel length: 5.02 m
Breech: horizontal sliding-wedge
Range: 6.5 km
Rate of fire: six rounds per hour
Engine: Daimler-Benz MB 507 C diesel, 580 hp

Mortars by country
Mortars